is a Japanese tokusatsu television miniseries produced by Tsuburaya Productions that was aired during the final segment of the Ultraman Retsuden programming block on TV Tokyo. The series was made and released following the success of the 2012 Ultra Series movie, Ultraman Saga, and is a tribute to the low-budget series, Ultra Fight. A DVD release of this miniseries was sold online on June 21, 2013, under the label .

Story

A New Power
Four monsters – Bemular, Telesdon, Sadola, and Gudon – are mysteriously revived at the Monster Graveyard. Ultraman Zero eliminates them and then meets their master, Alien Bat Glacier, who introduces his monster army, the Four Beast Warriors of Hell. Zero tries to attack, however, Glacier quickly traps him inside the Techtor Gear Hatred, armor which was created from the grudges of deceased monsters. Zero then suffers a one-sided defeat by Ex Red King. Pigmon, a small monster who Glacier accidentally revived, watches the battle from a safe distance. Ex Red King notices Pigmon and tries to eliminate him, but Zero absorbs the attack and uses his StrongCorona Zero form to escape before killing the monster.

Later, Zero and Pigmon find themselves trapped in a pocket dimension. While trying to escape, Zero recalls his reason for arriving at the Monster Graveyard, and tries to understand why Ultraman Dyna's and Cosmos's powers remained inside him after their last battle together. Suddenly, Glacier appears and brings Zero his next opponent: two clones of his alternate forms. He quickly realizes that his opponents are the images of his fear (and powers), and he faces them, defeating the true enemy, Galberos, and escaping from the pocket dimension. Once he is free, Glacier releases two monsters, Gan Q and Bemstar. As they fight Zero through the use of a wormhole connection, Zero assumes his second alternate form, LunaMiracle Zero, and kills them in one swoop.

Once the monsters are defeated, Glacier reveals that the Four Beast Warriors of Hell had achieved their purpose, and he absorbs their resentment in a climactic fight against Zero. In the middle of the battle, he exploits Pigmon by revealing that their life force is connected so that if Glacier dies, Pigmon would also die. Zero is forced to submit to Glacier's torture, however, Pigmon reassures him, which allows Zero to fight back by splitting into his alternate forms. LunaMiracle Zero separates Glacier from the restless monster spirits and saves Pigmon's life, then StrongCorona Zero uses Garnate Buster to defeat Glacier. In the aftermath of the battle, Zero finds the purpose of his new powers and reunites with his comrades.

Shining Zero
Five groups of aliens, known as the Darkness Five, discover Zero's capabilities from Glacier. Meanwhile, on a distant world, King Silvergon wreaks havoc on a planet that belonged to the Fanegon people. Ultraman Zero interferes and tames it using his LunaMiracle Zero form.

The Mother of Ultra appears and tells Zero that the Ultimate Force Zero have been turned into bronze statues. While investigating, Zero discovers the "Mother of Ultra" is Alien Hipporito Jathar, and that he is also going to be turned into a bronze statue. However, he uses this opportunity and finishes Jathar, saving himself and other victims from petrifaction. Victory is short-lived as another enemy appears in the form of Alien Temperor Villainous and his pet monster, Tyrant. Alien Mefilas Sly takes Pigmon hostage during the battle and attempts to lure Zero to the Monster Graveyard. Alien Groza Glocken and Alien Deathre Deathlog join the fight. Zero is weakened but aided by Ultimate Force Zero, allowing Zero to race to the Monster Graveyard. Zero quickly defeats Sly and frees Pigmon, but the true enemy appears to be Kaiser Darkness, who is actually Ultraman Belial.

During the fight, Kaiser Darkness is revealed to be an empty shell which houses Belial's restless spirit and eventually possesses Zero. As Zero plunges into darkness, Belial massacres the members of the Ultimate Force Zero. The real Ultraman Zero is left powerless, while Belial uses his body to lead the Darkness Five in conquest. Pigmon bravely tries to stop them, and Belial's attempt to kill Pigmon is mysteriously stopped. Zero was able to halt Belial, and brings forth his strongest form, Shining Zero. As Belial is expelled, Shining Zero regains control over his body and reverses time to undo the damage caused by Belial, reviving the Ultimate Force Zero. This exhausts him and he loses some memories. He joins his comrades in returning home as they try to pick a new name for Pigmon.

After the end credits, it is revealed that Shining Zero's time-reversal technique had also revived Belial. Realizing that Zero's strength comes from protecting those dear to him, Belial undertakes to make himself stronger while maintaining his leadership in the Darkness Five. Jathar is also revealed to have survived his apparent death.

Cast
: 
: 
: 
: 
:

A New Power Exclusive
:

Shining Zero Exclusive
: 
: 
: 
: 
: 
: 
:

Songs
Insert Themes

Lyrics: , 
Composition & Arrangement: 
Artist: Voyager
Played in the first part of Ultra Zero Fight.
"ULTRA FLY"
Composition: Hisashi Koyama
Arrangement: Koichiro Takahashi
Lyrics & Artist: Mamoru Miyano
Played in the second part of Ultra Zero Fight.

Ending Theme

Lyrics: 
Composition & Arrangement: Takao Konishi
Artist: Voyager
Played after the end of the second part of Ultra Zero Fight.

See also
 Ultra Series – Complete list of official Ultraman-related shows

References

External links
Ultra Zero Fight at Tsuburaya Productions 

2012 Japanese television series debuts
2013 Japanese television series endings
Ultra television series
TV Tokyo original programming